Cerro de La Isla is a mountain in the Andes of Chile.

See also
List of mountains in the Andes

Mountains of Chile